The coat of arms of Kamień County, West Pomeranian Voivodeship located in Poland, is divided horizontally into blue and white stripes, with 2 golden (yellow) crosiers and 2 red roses within blue stripe, and red Griffin with yellow claws and beak, within the white stripe. The flag of the county is a rectangle divided horizontally into white and blue stripes, with the coat of arms in the middle.

Design 
The coat of arms is a Iberian style escutcheon, that is divided horizontally onto two stripes: blue on the left, and silver (white) on the right. Within the blue stripe, are located two golden (yellow) crosiers, and two roses with red petals and golden (yellow) inside. Within the white stripe, is located a left-facing red Griffin with yellow claws and beak, with red tongue.

The elements within the blue stripe are a reference to the coat of arms of Kamień Pomorski, which is the seat of the county. Its coat of arms include John the Baptist with two golden (yellow) crosiers with roses. The red griffin on the white background, is a design that had been used by the House of Griffin, that ruled over Pomeralia in the Middle Ages.

The flag is a rectangle, that is divided horizontally into two stripes, white on the left, and blue, on the right, with the coat of arms placed in the middle. Its aspect ratio of height to width is 5:8.

History 
The coat of arms and flag had been adopted by the Council of Kamień County, on 3 February 2006, in the resolution no. XXXIV/254/2006.

References 

Kamień County
Kamien County
Kamien County
Kamien County
Kamien County
2006 establishments in Poland
Kamien County
Kamien County
Kamien County
Kamien County